Music Nepal (Nepali: म्यूजिक नेपाल) is a Nepalese Record label company. The company was founded in 1982 by Santosh Sharma. Initially, the company was focused in production of folk songs from different parts of the country in cassettes medium. Gradually, the company started recording various genres of music. Currently, it distributes music in digital platforms including iTunes, Spotify, Sony Music and YouTube. As of 2020, Music Nepal's YouTube channel is the most viewed entertainment channel from Nepal. The company also started its service though mobile apps in 2016 A.D. (2074 B.S.).

In 2005 it founded a music school and research centre named Nepal Music Center in Kathmandu. The company has also published the list of its recordings.

Significance
Music Nepal was the first recording company to formally pay royalties to the artists which helped to shape the music industry of Nepal. The royalty helped to change lifestyles of artists. The trend was then followed by other private recording industry. Music Nepal also helped to form copyright laws of Nepal.

Major artists

 Hira Devi Waiba, first female artist of Music Nepal.
 Sur Sudha
  Shringara Group 
Mingma Sherpa
Nabin Bhattarai
Prem Raja Mahat, sang first folk song recorded by Music Nepal, along with Bam Bahadur Karki.
Raju Lama
Deep Shrestha
Karna Das
Jhalak Man Gandarbha
Dinesh Subba
1974 AD

Music Nepal Awards

Music Nepal recognizes artists every year and provides cash award. A list of notable artist who received the awards are listed below:
Khem Raj Gurung, singer, 2056 BS 
Ratna Samsher Thapa, songwriter, 2076 BS
Kiran Kharel,  songwriter, 2076 BS
Deepak Jangum, musician, 2076 BS
Sambhujit Baskota, musician, 2076 BS

Controversies
Music Nepal was dragged on controversy over payment of royalty to the artists.

References

External links
Official website

Music organisations based in Nepal